Victoria "Vicky" Opitz (5 June 1988 in Madison, Wisconsin) is an American rower and four-time world champion in the eights. After retaining her world title in 2015, she was officially ranked #5 female rower in the world.

Rowing career
Opitz began rowing in 2006 at the University of Wisconsin. In 2011, she graduated in political science and communication. She lived and trained in Princeton, New Jersey. She now coaches lightweight rowing at the University of Wisconsin.

Her international debut in the USA eight resulted in victory at the Rowing World Cup in 2013 in Lucerne and was followed by victory at the 2013 World Rowing Championships in Chungju, South Korea.

References

 Victoria Opitz at USRowing
 

1988 births
Living people
American female rowers
Sportspeople from Madison, Wisconsin
University of Wisconsin–Madison College of Letters and Science alumni
World Rowing Championships medalists for the United States
21st-century American women